Other Men  is a 1997 Italian crime drama film written and directed  by Claudio Bonivento.

It is based on real-life characters documented in the Antonio Carlucci and Paolo Rossetti's book Io il Tebano ("I, the Theban"). For his performance Claudio Amendola received a Nastro d'Argento nomination for best actor.

Cast   
Claudio Amendola as Michele Croce
Ennio Fantastichini as Loris Corbi
 Antonino Iuorio as Turi Maiolo  
Veronica Pivetti as Maria De Simone
Ricky Memphis as Riccardo Zanni
 Ugo Conti as Ugo Conti
Tony Sperandeo as Salvatore
 Giovanna Nodari as Marina
  Stefania Montorsi as Mimma Croce
 Vincenzo Peluso as Rino

References

External links

Italian crime drama films
1997 crime drama films
1997 films
Films directed by Claudio Bonivento
1990s Italian films